Chen Yufan (born 18 November 1975) is a Chinese actor and singer of the pop duo Yu Quan.

Early life and education
Chen was born Chen Tao in Beijing, on November 18, 1975. He graduated from Beijing Food College.

Career
In 1994, Chen dropped out of school and started his career as a singer-songwriter. That same year, Hu Haiquan, who started composing at 11, came to Beijing from Northeast China and played keyboard for bands. In 1996, the two met for the first time and formed a band named "Yu Quan".

On November 17, 1998, he was assigned to Rock Records Co., Ltd. with Hu Haiquan, who joined the Yu Quan musical group. Their debut album, The Most Beautiful, was released on November 10, 1999, and sales exceeded one million. Their 2nd album, titled Callous to the End, was released in 2000. Their 3rd album, titled Ardently Love, was released in 2001. In the next few years, their released a member of music albums, such as I can't Live without You (2003), Thirty (2005), Friends are Difficult (2006), Everyone Has a Yu Quan in His Heart (2009), @Myself (2011), Regenerate (2013), Dare to Love (2014), Recalcitrate (2015).

Personal life
Chen married Bai Baihe on December 26, 2006. They first met while appearing in a Chinese romantic comedy television series Bloom of Youth in 2004. Their son, Chen Shengtong, was born on January 19, 2008. On April 16, 2017, Bai Baihe announced that they divorced at the end of 2015.

Drug scandal
On November 26, 2018, Chen was arrested by the Beijing Municipal Public Security Bureau for drug use and illegal possession of drugs. Chen's brokerage company responded that it was a rumor and would hold the rumor-maker criminally liable. 
But on November 28, the Sina Weibo account "Ping'an Shijingshan", the official Sina Weibo account of the Shijingshan branch of the Beijing Municipal Public Security Bureau, announced that two people had been arrested on November 26 for drug use and illegal possession of drugs in Beijing. It concealed their real names but disclosed their surnames as Chen and He. The one named Chen was said to be male, aged 43, a singer. In the afternoon, "Ping'an Beijing", the official Sina Weibo account of the Beijing Municipal Public Security Bureau, reposted the announcement from its Shijingshan branch, and commented, "Drugs make the 'Most Beautiful' wither". The "Most Beautiful" was the debut album released by the band "Yu Quan" in 1999. Later, the official Sina Weibo of People's Daily reposted the announcement from Shijingshan branch of the Beijing Municipal Public Security Bureau and posted the photo of Chen Yufan. This confirms the fact that he took drugs. Chen's brokerage company subsequently issued an apology letter.

Discography

Filmography

Film

Television

References

External links
 

1975 births
Living people
Singers from Beijing
Male actors from Beijing
Chinese male film actors
Chinese male television actors
21st-century Chinese  male singers